Corumbataí is a municipality in the state of São Paulo in Brazil. The population is 4,064 (2020 est.) in an area of 279 km². The elevation is 608 m.

References

External links
  https://web.archive.org/web/20050306185835/http://www.corumbatai.com.br/

Municipalities in São Paulo (state)